Angor (Anggor)  Senagi is a Senagi language of northern Papua New Guinea. It is spoken in 11 villages of Amanab Rural LLG, Sandaun Province, including Senagi village of Bibriari ward.

Dialects
Dialects are Wai (Central Anggor) and Samanai (Southern Anggor).

Loving and Bass (1964) list these Anggor dialects and their villages:

Western: Mongo
Central west: Amandan, Fisi, Kwaraman, Puramen
Central east: Akrani, Baribari, Bibriari, Merere, Nai, Senagi, Unupuwai, Wamu
Southern: Samanai

Writing system

Phonology
Angor has 18 consonants, which are:
{| 
| p || t ||  || k
|-
| b || d ||  || ɡ
|-
| ᵐb || ⁿd ||  || ᵑɡ
|-
| ɸ || s ||  || x
|-
| m || n ||  || ŋ
|-
|  || ɾ || || 
|-
| w ||  || j || 
|}

Angor has 7 vowels, which are:
{| 
| i || ɨ || u
|-
| e || ə || o
|-
| ||  a||
|}

References

External links 

 Angor Grammar Sketch
 PARADISEC archive items for Angor language

Senagi languages
Languages of Sandaun Province